Georges Patient (born 1 April 1949) is a member of the Senate of France, representing the territory of French Guiana. Since 2017, he has been affiliated with the La République En Marche (LREM) parliamentary group. He previously served as the Mayor of Mana from 1989 to 2017.

Honours 

 : Chevalier du Mérite agricole (2000)
 : Chevalier de l’Ordre national du Mérite

References
Page on the French Senate website

1949 births
Living people
French Guianan politicians
French people of French Guianan descent
French Senators of the Fifth Republic
Socialist Party (France) politicians
Guianese Socialist Party politicians
La République En Marche! politicians
Senators of French Guiana
People from Cayenne